Flora is an 1894 painting by Evelyn De Morgan. Her paintings are figural, foregrounding the female body through the use of spiritual, mythological, and allegorical themes. Flora is the Roman goddess of the flowers. In this portrait Flora  is depicted in front of a nescola or loquat tree which bears fruits in the spring. This painting is clearly inspired by Botticelli's work, Primavera and The Birth of Venus.

The painting, owned by De Morgan Foundation was displayed at De Morgan Centre until its closure in 2014, since then it is displayed at Wightwick Manor, run by National Trust for Places of Historic Interest or Natural Beauty.

References

1894 paintings
Portraits of women
Paintings by Evelyn De Morgan
Paintings of Roman goddesses